Zhavoronkovo is a rural locality (a village) in Staroselskoye Rural Settlement, Vologodsky District, Vologda Oblast, Russia. The population was 6 as of 2002.

Geography 
Zhavoronkovo is located 27 km southwest of Vologda (the district's administrative centre) by road. Ananyino is the nearest rural locality.

References 

Rural localities in Vologodsky District